Amadeus II of Montfaucon (1130–1195) was Count of Montbéliard and Lord of Montfaucon from 1163 until his death. He was the son of Richard II of Montfaucon and Sophie of Montbéliard, daughter of Theodoric II, Count of Montbéliard. He was ultimately succeeded by his son Richard III of Montfaucon.

He first married to Beatrice Grandson-Joinville, then Osilie of Faucogney, and had the following issue:
 Walter I of Montbéliard who was Regent of the Kingdom of Cyprus (1206-1210).
 Richard III who succeed his father
 Agnès of Montfaucon

Amadeus was a member of the House of Montfaucon, and was the Count of Montbéliard from 1163 until his death in 1195.

House of Montfaucon
Counts of Montbéliard
1130 births
1195 deaths